The 1996 Asian Super Cup was the 2nd Asian Super Cup, a football match played between the winners of the previous season's Asian Club Championship and Asian Cup Winners Cup competitions. The 1996 competition was contested by Cheonan Ilhwa Chunma of South Korea, who won the 1995 Asian Club Championship, and Bellmare Hiratsuka of Japan, the winners of the 1995–96 Asian Cup Winners' Cup.

Route to the Super Cup

Cheonan Ilhwa Chunma 

1Ilhwa Chunma goals always recorded first.
2 GD Lam Pak withdrew after the 1st leg.

Bellmare Hiratsuka 

1Bellmare Hiratsuka goals always recorded first.

Match summary 

|}

First leg

Second leg

References 
 Asian Super Cup 1996

Asian Super Cup
Super
Asia
Asian Super Cup
Asian Super Cup
International club association football competitions hosted by Japan
International club association football competitions hosted by South Korea
Shonan Bellmare matches
Seongnam FC matches